The Sullivan Foundation is a non-profit organization dedicated to finding, developing, and furthering the careers of promising opera singers within the United States. Founded through the bequest of a prominent lawyer, William Matheus Sullivan (1885-1947), the foundation has awarded grants to close to 500 singers. Awards are given on the basis of an annual audition hosted by the foundation. The first director of the foundation was Edward Johnson, general manager of the Metropolitan Opera.

Past recipients of the Sullivan Award include such noted singers as Christine Brewer, Jessye Norman, Jerry Hadley, Kathleen Battle, Michael Devlin, Renée Fleming, Leona Mitchell, Susan Graham, Patricia Racette, Hanan Alattar, and Elizabeth Futral.

External links
 official site of The Sullivan Foundation

Classical music awards
Arts foundations based in the United States
Music organizations based in the United States
Music competitions in the United States
Opera competitions
Organizations established in 1956